UWG can refer to

University of West Georgia
UWG Inc.